Hazel Dell may refer to:
Hazel Dell, Saskatchewan, Canada
Rural Municipality of Hazel Dell No. 335, Saskatchewan
Hazel Dell, Illinois, USA
Hazel Dell, Comanche County, Texas, USA
Hazel Dell, Washington, USA
Hazel Dell Township, Pottawattamie County, Iowa